In Greek mythology, Ialysus (Ancient Greek: Ἰάλυσον Ialysos) or Jalysus (Ἰᾱλυσός) was the eponymous founder of Ialysus in Rhodes. He was the eldest son of the Rhodian king, Cercaphus, one of the Heliades, and his niece Cydippe, daughter of Ochimus, also a former king. He had two younger brothers, Lindus and Camirus. In some accounts, Ialysus' parents were given as Rhode and Poseidon.

Mythology 
Ialysus and his brothers succeeded to the throne after their father's death. During their time, the great deluge came in which their mother, who was now named as Cyrbe, was buried beneath the flood and laid waste. Later on, they parted the land among themselves, and each of them founded a city which bore his name.

See also
 Telchines

Notes

References 

 Diodorus Siculus, The Library of History translated by Charles Henry Oldfather. Twelve volumes. Loeb Classical Library. Cambridge, Massachusetts: Harvard University Press; London: William Heinemann, Ltd. 1989. Vol. 3. Books 4.59–8. Online version at Bill Thayer's Web Site
 Diodorus Siculus, Bibliotheca Historica. Vol 1-2. Immanel Bekker. Ludwig Dindorf. Friedrich Vogel. in aedibus B. G. Teubneri. Leipzig. 1888-1890. Greek text available at the Perseus Digital Library.
 Grimal, Pierre, The Dictionary of Classical Mythology, Wiley-Blackwell, 1996. .
 Hard, Robin, The Routledge Handbook of Greek Mythology: Based on H.J. Rose's "Handbook of Greek Mythology", Psychology Press, 2004, . Google Books.
 Parada, Carlos, Genealogical Guide to Greek Mythology, Jonsered, Paul Åströms Förlag, 1993. .
 Pindar, Odes translated by Diane Arnson Svarlien. 1990. Online version at the Perseus Digital Library.
 Pindar, The Odes of Pindar including the Principal Fragments with an Introduction and an English Translation by Sir John Sandys, Litt.D., FBA. Cambridge, MA., Harvard University Press; London, William Heinemann Ltd. 1937. Greek text available at the Perseus Digital Library.
 Smith, William, Dictionary of Greek and Roman Biography and Mythology, London (1873). Online version at the Perseus Digital Library.
Strabo, The Geography of Strabo. Edition by H.L. Jones. Cambridge, Mass.: Harvard University Press; London: William Heinemann, Ltd. 1924. Online version at the Perseus Digital Library.
Strabo, Geographica edited by A. Meineke. Leipzig: Teubner. 1877. Greek text available at the Perseus Digital Library.

Children of Poseidon
Demigods in classical mythology
Rhodian characters in Greek mythology